Martin County School District, also referred to officially as the School Board of Martin County, is a public school district that covers Martin County, Florida.

The position of superintendent is appointed by the school board. Its former Superintendent, Laurie J. Gaylord, was first elected in 2012, with her second term ending in November 2020. Following a decision by voters in 2018, the next Superintendent was appointed rather than elected. The current superintendent, John D. Millay, took office in 2020. The district is overseen by the Martin County School Board, a body of five elected officers.

School Board 
The district School Board is elected on a non-partisan basis. Members of the board are:

District 1:  Christia Li Roberts
District 2:  Marsha Powers
District 3:  Victoria Defenthaler
District 4:  Anthony Anderson
District 5:  Michael DiTerlizzi

Schools 
The district operates the following public schools:

High schools 
Jensen Beach High School
Martin County High School
South Fork High School

Middle schools 
Dr. David L. Anderson Middle School. Named for the first Black person to be elected to the county School Board & Florida's longest-serving school board member
Hidden Oaks Middle School
Indiantown Middle School
Murray Middle School. Robert G. Murray, an African American, was a teacher from 1928 to 1937 and from 1945 to 1958 and was principal of Stuart Training School.
Stuart Middle School

Elementary schools 
Bessey Creek Elementary School
Citrus Grove Elementary School
Crystal Lake Elementary School
Felix A. Williams Elementary School
Hobe Sound Elementary School
Jensen Beach Elementary School
J.D. Parker School of Science, Math and Technology
Palm City Elementary School
Pinewood Elementary School
Port Salerno Elementary School
SeaWind Elementary School
Warfield Elementary School

Pre-K 
Citrus Grove Elementary School
Felix A. Williams Elementary School
Perkins Center
Salerno Schoolhouse
Salerno Learning Center
Stuart Learning Center

Charter schools 
Clark Advanced Learning Center
The Hope Charter Center for Autism

Other programs 
The district operates the following other programs:

Career and Technical Education
Willoughby Learning Center
Environmental Studies Center
Martin Virtual School
Spectrum
Teenage Parent Center – Florida First Start Resource Center Indiantown
Teenage Parent Center – Spectrum

Former segregated (negro) schools 
 Booker Park Elementary School, Indiantown, closed 1970
 Dunbar Elementary School, Hobe Sound, closed 1969
 East Stuart Elementary School, Stuart, closed 1970 (turned into county-wide kindergarten magnet)
 Murray Junior/Senior High, Port Salerno (originally Carver Junior/Senior High, also called Carver Training School and Murray Training School), opened 1964 replacing Stuart Training School, closed 1967 (became county-wide 9th grade)
 Stuart Training School, Stuart, closed 1964
 A "one-room schoolhouse in Jensen Beach".

References

External links 
 

 
School districts in Florida
Education in Martin County, Florida
Educational institutions in the United States with year of establishment missing
Stuart, Florida